Aravind Kaushik (born January 14, 1980) is an Indian film director, screenwriter who works in Kannada cinema. He rose to fame with 2010 film Nam Areal Ond Dina.

Career
Aravind Kaushik began his career as an dubbing artist in 2002 film Joot. He continued as a dubbing artist for Excuse Me (2003), Nenapirali (2005), 7 O' Clock (2006), Honganasu (2007). He made his direction debut with 2010 film Nam Areal Ond Dina starring Anish Tejeshwar, Meghana Gaonkar, Rakshit Shetty. He then directed Thuglak in 2012. He wrote lyrics for 2013 film Coffee with My wife. Kaushik has also directed some television serials. In 2017 he directed Huliraaya starring Balu Nagendra and Divya.

Personal life
Aravind Kaushik (14 January 1980) was born and brought up in Bangalore, Karnataka, India. He married Shilpa an actress in 2010.

Filmography
As a dubbing artist

As a director and lyricist

Television

References

External links
 

1980 births
Living people
Kannada film directors
Film directors from Bangalore
21st-century Indian film directors